The Joint Research Centre (JRC) is the European Commission's science and knowledge service which employs scientists to carry out research in order to provide independent scientific advice and support to European Union (EU) policy.

Leadership
The JRC is a directorate-general of the European Commission under the responsibility of Mariya Gabriel, the European Commissioner for Innovation, Research, Culture, Education and Youth. The current director-general of the JRC is Stephen Quest, who took office in 2020, succeeding Vladimír Šucha. Its Board of Governors assists and advises the director-general on matters relating to the role and the scientific, technical and financial management of the JRC.

Structure
Composed of strategy and coordination, knowledge production, knowledge management and support directorates, the JRC is spread across six sites in five EU countries: in Belgium (Brussels and Geel), Germany (Karlsruhe), Italy (Ispra), the Netherlands (Petten), and Spain (Seville). Their responsibilities are:

 to create, manage and make sense of knowledge to support European policies with independent evidence
 to develop innovative tools and make them available to policymakers
 to anticipate emerging issues that need to be addressed at EU level and understand policy environments
 to share know-how with EU countries, the scientific community and international partners
 to contribute to the overall objective of Horizon 2020
 to conduct Euratom-funded research on nuclear safety and security to contribute to the transition to a carbon-free economy.

History
The Italian Centre in Ispra originally belonged to the Comitato Nazionale per l'Energia Nucleare (CNEN) and was officially transferred to the Community on 1 March 1961. Since 1973, non-nuclear research evolved rapidly, especially in topics related to safety and the environment. After 16 years of research, the nuclear reactor at JRC Ispra was shut down in 1983. At the beginning of the 1980s, a re-examination of the mandate and evaluation of the activities of the JRC began. Future activities were to continue to support the commission's implementations of Community policies. In 1992, the results of a study led to a proposal to convert the JRC Ispra site into an environmentally-optimised model site; the "ECO Centre". The JRC employs around 2787 staff with an annual budget of 372,5 million euros for 2017.

Science areas
The JRC research activities are clustered into ten science areas:

 Agriculture and food security
 Economic and Monetary Union
 Energy and transport
 Environment and climate change
 Health and consumer protection
 Information Society
 Innovation and growth
 Nuclear safety and security
 Safety and Security
 Standards

See also
European Commissioner for Innovation, Research, Culture, Education and Youth
Best Available Techniques Reference Document (BREF)
Directorate-General for Research
Directorate-General for Information Society and Media (European Commission)
European Research Area (ERA)
European Research Council (ERC)
European Institute of Technology (EIT)
European Research Advisory Board (EURAB)
European School
Framework Programmes for Research and Technological Development
Joint Technology Initiative
Lisbon Strategy
Seventh Framework Programme
Scientific Advice Mechanism
Sixth Framework Programme

References

External links
Joint Research Centre (JRC) – EU Science Hub

European Union and science and technology
Science and technology in Europe
Directorates-General in the European Commission